William Quinn may refer to:

 Bill Quinn (1912-1994), American film actor
 Liam Quinn (born 1949), aka William Quinn, member of the Provisional IRA
 William Quinn (actor) (1884–1965), Canadian film and stage actor
 William F. Quinn (1919–2006), governor of Hawaii
 William J. Quinn (1883–1963), chief of police in San Francisco, California
 William John Quinn (1911–2015), railroad executive
 William P. Quinn (1900–1978), Garda Commissioner
 William Paul Quinn (1788–1873), bishop of the African Methodist Episcopal Church
 William Wilson Quinn (1907–2000), Chevalier Lieutenant General, commanding general of the Seventh United States Army